Zipless is the first solo album by singer Vanessa Daou, released in 1994.

Track listing

"The Long Tunnel Of Wanting You"
"Dear Anne Sexton"
"Alcestis On The Poetry Circuit"
"Sunday Afternoons" - single
"Autumn Perspective"
"Near The Black Forest" - single
"My Love Is Too Much"
"Becoming A Nun"
"Smoke"
"Autumn Reprise"

References

1994 debut albums
Vanessa Daou albums